Abdullah bin Abdullah Al Saud (born July 1843) was a member of the Al Thunayan family, a branch of the House of Saud. He was a son of Abdullah bin Thunayan, Emir of Nejd. Relatively little is known of the life of Abdullah bin Abdullah.

Abdullah was born in July 1843, on the day his father died. As an adult, he made attempts to rebuild the Second Saudi State that his ancestors had ruled over. Abdullah eventually ended up in the Ottoman capital of Constantinople, where he ostensibly spent the rest of his life. 

Abdullah married a Turkish Circassian woman and had six children. He was the father of Ahmed bin Abdullah Al Thunayan, advisor to King Abdulaziz of Saudi Arabia (founder of the Third Saudi State, the Kingdom of Saudi Arabia). Through his son Mohammad, Abdullah was the grandfather of Iffat bint Mohammad Al Thunayan, the consort of King Faisal. Queen Iffat was a prominent education activist in Saudi Arabia.

Life
Abdullah bin Abdullah Al Saud was the son of Abdullah bin Thunayan, Emir of Nejd from 1841 to 1843. Abdullah bin Thunayan became emir after overthrowing his cousin Khalid bin Saud in 1841. In 1843 Abdullah was himself overthrown by another cousin, Faisal bin Turki, who imprisoned him in Al Masmak fort. Emir Abdullah died in July of that year. One of his sons was born the same day he died, and due to this he was named Abdullah after his father.

In 1879 Abdullah bin Abdullah headed to Constantinople, hoping to gain control over territory in the Al-Hasa region which the Ottomans had seized from his Al Saud relatives. While he was going towards Constantinople he sought the support of British authorities in Damascus and Cairo, among other places, but nothing came of this. Little is known about Abdullah after he reached Constantinople in August 1880, where he became known as Abdullah Pasha ( ʿAbd Allāh Bāshā).

Family
While he was in Constantinople, Abdullah married a Circassian woman named Tazeruh. Together they had four children, Mohammad Saud, the twins Ahmed and Al Jawhara, and Sulaiman. Abdullah also had two sons from a second marriage named Abdul Rahman and Abdul Qadir. Abdullah's son Mohammad became a physician in the Ottoman army and was the father of Queen Iffat, the wife of King Faisal. Another of his sons, Ahmed, was an advisor to King Abdulaziz.

References

Abdullah
1843 births
Abdullah
Abdullah
Sons of monarchs
Year of death missing